Bavant may refer to:

John Bavant (fl. 1550–1598) English Roman Catholic priest
Fifield Bavant, a village in Wiltshire, England
Norton Bavant, a village in Wiltshire, England